The Watt–Groce–Fickhardt House is a historic house in Circleville, Ohio, United States.  Located along Main Street on the city's eastern side, it is a distinctive landmark and has been named a historic site.

Circleville was platted in 1810 on a farm owned by Jacob Ziegler and Samuel Watt; later in the year, Ziegler sold his interest in the farm to Watt.  With the community's rapid expansion, Watt sold more land; by 1820, only  remained in his ownership.  Using the money from the land sales, Watt built a new farmhouse in 1826; two stories high, it is a brick structure with a stone foundation and a metal roof.  When completed, it was a typical hall and parlor house.

As Circleville continued to grow, Watt sold most of his remaining land in 1835; only  remained after the end of that year.  Becoming a leading local businessman, he made an extensive addition to the house in 1852; this new structure took the form of an I-house.  A smaller addition, built in 1885, is a frame structure attached to the original portion of the house.

Today, the Watt–Groce–Fickhardt House remains a well-preserved example of antebellum architecture.  In 1985, the house was listed on the National Register of Historic Places, qualifying because of its historic architecture and because of its connection to a later resident, John G. Groce, who was a leading member of local society.

References

Houses completed in 1826
Circleville, Ohio
Hall and parlor houses
Houses in Pickaway County, Ohio
Houses on the National Register of Historic Places in Ohio
I-houses in Ohio
National Register of Historic Places in Pickaway County, Ohio
1826 establishments in Ohio